Sporting Clube de Espinho, also known as Sporting de Espinho, is a Portuguese sports club from the city of Espinho in the Aveiro district. Besides football, the club has volleyball and handball departments that usually compete in the major Portuguese top leagues. Other sport departments are those in athletics, swimming and futsal.

History
Founded in 1914, it is one of the oldest clubs in Portugal. In 1925, SC Espinho's football team reached the semifinals of the Campeonato de Portugal, their highest round to date. The team also played 11 seasons in the Portuguese First Division between 1975 and 1997. They currently compete in AF Aveiro Campeonato Sabseg.

The football team played their home games at Estádio Comendador Manuel Violas in Espinho, until 2018. Since 2018, the team has been playing in temporary stadiums such as: Estadio do Bolhão (2018–2020) or Estadio Marques da Silva (since 2020). The club is aiming is to play in the future municipal stadium of the city of Espinho

Current squad

Honours

Segunda Liga: 1
1991–92

Portuguese Second Division: 1
 2003–04

Taça Ribeiro dos Reis: 1
1966–67

AF Aveiro Championship: 10
1924–25, 1925–26, 1926–27, 1927–28, 1929–30, 1931–32, 1933–34, 1940–41, 1943–44, 1944–45

AF Aveiro First Division: 4
1947–48, 1950–51, 1960–61, 2016–17

 Taça de Honra do Porto: 1
 1917–18

League and cup history
{|class="wikitable"
|-bgcolor="#efefef"
! Season
!
! Pos.
! Pl.
! W
! D
! L
! GS
! GA
! P
!Portuguese Cup
!Notes
|-
|1974–1975
|1D
|align=right |16
|align=right|30||align=right|4||align=right|7||align=right|19
|align=right|25||align=right|64||align=right|15
||
|Relegated
|-
|1977–1978
|1D
|align=right |14
|align=right|30||align=right|8||align=right|6||align=right|16
|align=right|30||align=right|52||align=right|22
||
|Relegated
|-
|1979–1980
|1D
|align=right |7
|align=right|30||align=right|11||align=right|6||align=right|13
|align=right|29||align=right|42||align=right|28
||
|
|-
|1980–1981
|1D
|align=right |9
|align=right|30||align=right|9||align=right|9||align=right|12
|align=right|26||align=right|35||align=right|27
||
|
|-
|1981–1982
|1D
|align=right |10
|align=right|30||align=right|7||align=right|11||align=right|12
|align=right|32||align=right|42||align=right|25
||
|
|-
|1982–1983
|1D
|align=right |13
|align=right|30||align=right|9||align=right|7||align=right|14
|align=right|23||align=right|37||align=right|25
||
|
|-
|1983–1984
|1D
|align=right |16
|align=right|30||align=right|5||align=right|7||align=right|18
|align=right|19||align=right|45||align=right|17
||
|Relegated
|-
|1987–1988
|1D
|align=right |6
|align=right|38||align=right|13||align=right|14||align=right|11
|align=right|42||align=right|38||align=right|40
||
|Best Classification Ever
|-
|1988–1989
|1D
|align=right |17
|align=right|38||align=right|12||align=right|8||align=right|18
|align=right|45||align=right|57||align=right|32
||
|Relegated
|-
|1992–1993
|1D
|align=right |17
|align=right|34||align=right|9||align=right|10||align=right|15
|align=right|38||align=right|55||align=right|28
||
|Relegated
|-
|1996–1997
|1D
|align=right |16
|align=right|34||align=right|9||align=right|6||align=right|19
|align=right|27||align=right|56||align=right|33
||
|Relegated
|-
|2007–2008
|2DH
|align=right |2
|align=right|24||align=right|11||align=right|9||align=right|4
|align=right|38||align=right|26||align=right|42
||Round 3
|
|}

References

External links
 

Football clubs in Portugal
Association football clubs established in 1914
1914 establishments in Portugal
Sport in Espinho, Portugal
Primeira Liga clubs
Liga Portugal 2 clubs